Galinakopf is a mountain on the border of Austria and Liechtenstein in the Rätikon range of the Eastern Alps, with a height of .

References
 
 

Mountains of the Alps
Mountains of Liechtenstein
Mountains of Vorarlberg
Austria–Liechtenstein border
International mountains of Europe